A Little Nest (Swedish: Litet bo) is a 1956 Swedish comedy film directed by Arne Mattsson and starring Maj-Britt Nilsson, Folke Sundquist and Edvin Adolphson. It was shot on location in Denmark. The film's sets were designed by the art director Bibi Lindström.

Cast
 Maj-Britt Nilsson as 	Alva
 Folke Sundquist as Lennart Ljung
 Edvin Adolphson as 	Stor-Knutte
 Nils Hallberg as 	Hasse Berggren
 Siv Ericks as 	Emy
 Henny Moan as 	Li
 Douglas Håge as 	Staff Sergeant
 Preben Mahrt as 	Leo 
 Stig Järrel as 	Director
 Malene Schwartz as 	Christl
 Sigge Fürst as 	Office Manager
 Marguerite Viby as 	Teacher
 Sven Magnusson as 	Man with motor boat
 Curt Löwgren as 	His friend
 Stig Johanson as 	Driver
 John Melin as 	Customer in shoe-store
 Birger Lensander as 	Hagström, janitor
 Carl-Gustaf Lindstedt as 	Nightwalker
 Yngve Nordwall as 	Man in auto repair shop
 Carl-Axel Elfving as 	Tram conductor

References

Bibliography 
 Qvist, Per Olov & von Bagh, Peter. Guide to the Cinema of Sweden and Finland. Greenwood Publishing Group, 2000.

External links 
 

1956 films
Swedish comedy films
1956 comedy films
1950s Swedish-language films
Films directed by Arne Mattsson
1950s Swedish films
Swedish black-and-white films